Water tunnels are tunnels (below-ground channels) used to transport water to areas with large populations or agriculture. They are frequently part of aqueducts.  Some aqueducts, such as the Delaware Aqueduct are single long tunnels.  In other cases, such as the San Jacinto tunnel on the Colorado River Aqueduct, water tunnels form parts of far longer aqueducts.  In cases where the outflow of a water tunnel is into an existing stream or river flowing to the point of water use, the term aqueduct is less likely to be used, as with the Harold D. Roberts Tunnel from Dillon Reservoir to the North Fork South Platte River.

Notable water tunnels, or systems including water tunnels
Alva B. Adams Tunnel from the western slope of the Colorado River drainage to the eastern Front Range of Colorado, 
Angeles Tunnel 7.2 mile (11.6 km)
Bagur Navile Tunnel 6 miles (9.7 km)
Bosporus Water Tunnel 
Chicago Tunnel and Reservoir Plan 109.4 miles (176.1 km)
Denver Water
Moffat Tunnel 6.2 miles (10.0 km)
Harold D. Roberts Tunnel from Dillon Reservoir 23.3 miles (37.5 km)
Dingshan Tunnel on the Irtysh–Karamay–Ürümqi Canal (China) 4.6 miles 7.4 km
Metropolitan Water District of Southern California
San Jacinto Tunnel on the Colorado River Aqueduct 13 mi (21 km)
New York City water supply system
Catskill Aqueduct 28 miles (45 km) of grade tunnel, 35 miles (56 km) of pressure tunnel.
Delaware Aqueduct 85 miles (137 km)
New York City Water Tunnel No. 3 60 miles (97 km)
Päijänne Water Tunnel 75 miles (120 km)
San Juan-Chama Project
 Azotea Tunnel 12.8 miles (20.6 km)
 The Inter-reservoirs Transfer Scheme (IRTS) in Kwai Chung and Sha Tin, New Territories, Hong Kong

See also
 Canal tunnel
 Culvert
 Qanat